The Beirut International Exhibition & Leisure Center (commonly BIEL) is a large multi-purpose facility, hosting exhibitions (Beirut Book Fair), conferences, concerts and private events. It opened on 28 November 2001. It moved from what is now called the Arena Waterfront to its current location on Emile Lahoud highway in 2018.

Famous performances
American pop-R&B diva Mariah Carey gave the Beirut concert of her Charmbracelet World Tour on 24 February 2004 at the BIEL. British pop musician Phil Collins took a part of a charity concert for children’s cancer at the BIEL in 2005. On 10 June 2006, rapper 50 Cent and The G-Unit performed their first concert in the Arab world at the BIEL. On May 26, 2011, Colombian singer Shakira, who has Lebanese origin, was set to perform in the hall later was moved to the outside due to overwhelming ticket sales. On 23 July 2014, English singer-songwriter Ellie Goulding performed in the BIEL as part of her The Halcyon Tour. British Pink Floyd tribute band Brit Floyd performed at the venue in December 2015.  Avicii performed in the BIEL on 22 July 2016.

Record
Shakira holds the record for the most attended concert in Lebanon with around 32,000 people.

See also
Beirut Central District
Beirut Nights
Beirut

References

External links
Official website

Convention centers in Lebanon
Buildings and structures in Beirut
Commercial buildings completed in 2008
Concert halls in Lebanon
Tourist attractions in Beirut